Xuanwumen Station is an interchange station between Line 2 and Line 4 of the Beijing Subway. It is named for Xuanwumen, a former gate in Beijing's city wall that was demolished during construction of the subway. The station opened in 1971 and handles an average of 350,000 passengers per day in 2012. Interchange volumes can reach per hour can reach 15,000 passengers per hour in the morning peak. The large transfer volumes overwhelm the small interchange corridors, which can narrow to only 2.4 meters in width. Three new transfer corridors were added in 2020, increasing transfer capacity of the station six-fold to around 55,000 passengers per hour.

Station Layout 
Both the line 2 and 4 stations have underground island platforms.

Exits 
There are 6 exits, lettered B, C, E, F, G, and H. Exit G are accessible.

Gallery

References

External links

Railway stations in China opened in 1971
Beijing Subway stations in Xicheng District